Javier Remírez Apesteguía (born 5 April 1975) is a Navarrese politician, First Vice President of Navarre and Minister of the Presidency, Equality, Civil Service and Interior since August 2019.

References

1975 births
Spanish Socialist Workers' Party politicians
Government ministers of Navarre
Living people
Politicians from Navarre
Vice Presidents of Navarre